Sudipta Kaviraj (born 1945) is a scholar of South Asian Politics and Intellectual History, often associated with Postcolonial and Subaltern Studies.  He is currently teaching at Columbia University in the department of Middle Eastern, South Asian and African Studies.

Education

Sudipta Kaviraj was a student of Political Science at the Presidency College of the University of Calcutta. He received his Ph.D. from Jawaharlal Nehru University, New Delhi.

Career

He is a Professor of South Asian Politics and South Asian Intellectual History, as well as the former department chair of the Middle Eastern, South Asian, and African Studies department at Columbia University. Prior to joining Columbia University, he was a Professor in Politics in the Department of Politics at the School of Oriental and African Studies at the University of London. He was also Associate Professor of Political Science at JNU, New Delhi. He also held a Visiting Fellowship at St Antony's College, Oxford.

He was a founding member of the Subaltern Studies Collective.

Opinions

The Enchantment of Democracy and India” (Permanent Black 2011)
"The history of modern India tells us a complex, surprising, captivating, and yet unconcluded story of freedom. It is appropriate to express a Tocquevillesque astonishment at this historical phenomenon. If we look from age to age, from the earliest antiquity to the present day, we can agree with Tocqueville that nothing like this has ever happened before. We have not yet seen the end of this unprecedented historical process… For, the eventual shape of the destination of this process might be unclear, but the movement towards a greater expansion of freedom is irreversible."

Selected publications
The Unhappy Consciousness: Bankimchandra Chattopadhyay and the Formation of Nationalist Discourse in India, 1993, 
Politics in India, Oxford University Press, 1999, 
Civil Society: History and Possibilities, Cambridge University Press, 2001, 
"Imaginary Institutions of India", Permanent Black, 2010,

References

External links
Middle Eastern, South Asian, and African Studies Department Website

Bengali people
Columbia University faculty
Academic staff of Jawaharlal Nehru University
Fellows of St Antony's College, Oxford
Presidency University, Kolkata alumni
University of Calcutta alumni
Jawaharlal Nehru University alumni
Academics of SOAS University of London
1945 births
Living people